Claude Dauphin (19 August 1903 – 16 November 1978) was a French actor. He appeared in more than 130 films between 1930 and 1978.

Biography
He was born in Corbeil-Essonnes, Essonne.  His father was Maurice Étienne Legrand, a poet who wrote as Franc-Nohain, and who was the librettist for Maurice Ravel's opera L'heure espagnole. His elder brother was the writer Jean Nohain.

Dauphin's debut on film came in La Vagabonde (1930). He debuted on stage in Chapeau Chinois (1930) in Paris.

Private life
Dauphin married three times: first to Rosine Derean, then to the actress Maria Mauban with whom  he had a child, Jean-Claude Dauphin, also an actor. Eventually, in 1955, Dauphin married American actress Norma Eberhardt. The couple divided their time between Paris, Los Angeles, New York City and Ocean Township, New Jersey. They remained together until Dauphin's death in Paris in 1978.

Selected filmography

 A Tale of the Fox (1930) - Monkey (voice)
 Tout s'arrange (1931) - Émile
 The Fortune (1931) - Joannis
 To the Polls, Citizens (1932) - René Faradin
  (1932) - Bobby
 Moonlight (1932) - Jacques
 A Happy Man (1932) - Claude Moreuil
 Paris-Soleil (1933) - Fernand
 La Fille du régiment (1933) - Lieutenant Williams
 Le Rayon des amours (1933) - André
 Boubouroche (1933) - André
 The Abbot Constantine (1933) - Paul de Laverdens
 D'amour et d'eau fraîche (1933) - Andre
  (1933) - Prince Philippe
 Pas besoin d'argent (1933) - Paul
  (1934) - Jean Servin
 Dédé (1934) - André 'Dédé' de la Huchette
  (1935) - André Chabrolles
  (1935) - Le neveu
 Return to Paradise (1935) - Robert Ginet
 La Route heureuse (1936) - Paul Venieri
 Let's Make a Dream (1936) - Un invité 
 The Pearls of the Crown (1937) - Le prisonnier italien en Abyssinie
 The Tale of the Fox (1937) - Robert Grésillon
 The Curtain Rises (1938) - François Polti
 Conflit (1938) - Gérard
  (1939) - Docteur Jean Durand
 Radio Surprises (1940) - Himself
 Cavalcade d'amour (1940) - Léandre, Hubert & Georges
 Beating Heart (1940) - Léandre, Hubert & Georges
 Paris-New York (1940) - Paul Landry
 Strange Suzy (1941) - Jacques Hébert
  (1942) - Jean Cartier
  (1942) - Henri Vermont
 Les Petits Riens (1942) - Drial (uncredited)
 The Beautiful Adventure (1942) - Valentin Le Barroyer
 A Woman in the Night (1943) - François Rousseau
 Les Deux Timides (1943) - Jules Frémissin
 The Lady Vanishes (1944) - Le commissaire de police
 English Without Tears (1944) - François de Freycinet
 Felicie Nanteuil (1944) - Aimé Cavalier
 Dorothy Looks for Love (1945) - Robert
 Une femme coupée en morceaux (1946)
 Tombé du ciel (1946) - Maurice
 Cyrano de Bergerac (1946) - Cyrano de Bergerac
 We Are Not Married (1946) - Fernand
 Paris 1900 (1947) - Robert Chesnay aka Michel Trévines
 L'éventail (1947) - Jacques Brévannes
 Rendezvous in Paris (1947) - Robert Chesnay
 Van Gogh (1948) - Narrator (voice)
 Route sans issue (1948) - Jacques Audoin
  (1948) - M. de la Bergère
 Impeccable Henri (1948) - Henri - le majordome
 Croisière pour l'inconnu (1948) - Clément Fournil
 Jean de la Lune (1949) - Jeff - un marchand de fleurs follement amoureux de Marceline
 Le Bal des pompiers (1949) - Camille, Olivier and Henri Grégeois
  (1949) - Harry Belmont
  (1949) - Le pianiste André Fuger
 The Chocolate Girl (1950) - Paul Normand
 Deported (1950) - Vito Bucelli
 Le Plaisir (1952) - Le docteur (segment "Le Masque")
 Casque d'or (1952) - Félix Leca
 Adorable Creatures (1952) - Récitant / Narrator (voice)
 April in Paris (1952) - Philippe Fouquet
 Innocents in Paris (1953) - Max de Lonne
 Little Boy Lost (1953) - Pierre Verdier
 Les Trois Mousquetaires (1953) - Commentant le film par la voix de (voice)
 Phantom of the Rue Morgue (1954) - Insp. Bonnard
 Les mauvaises rencontres (1955) - Le docteur Jacques Daniéli
  (1956) - Le récitant / Narrator (voice, uncredited)
 The Quiet American (1958) - Inspector Vigot
  (1958) - Jean Servin
 Pourquoi viens-tu si tard? (1959) - René Dargillière
 The Full Treatment (1960) - David Prade
 Tiara Tahiti (1962) - Henri Farengue
 Le Diable et les Dix Commandements (1962) - Georges Beaufort (segment "Luxurieux point ne seras")
  (1963) - Valoti
 La Bonne Soupe (1964) - M. Oscar
 The Visit (1964) - Bardick
 Compartiment tueurs (1965) - Le frère d'Eliane (uncredited)
 Lady L (1965) - Inspector Mercier
 Is Paris Burning? (1966) - Colonel Lebel
 Grand Prix (1966) - Hugo Simon
 Da Berlino l'apocalisse (1967) - Lasalle
 Two for the Road (1967) - Maurice Dalbret
 Lamiel (1967) - Le marquis d'Orpiez
 L'une et l'autre (1967) - Serebriakov
 Hamilchama al hashalom (1968 documentary) - Narrator 
 Adolphe ou l'Âge tendre (1968) - Monsieur Rebecque
 Barbarella (1968) - President of Earth
 Hard Contract (1969) - Maurice
 The Madwoman of Chaillot (1969) - Dr. Jadin
 Églantine (1972) - Clément
 La più bella serata della mia vita (1972) - Cancelliere Bouisson
 Au rendez-vous de la mort joyeuse (1973) - Father D'Aval
 Vogliamo i colonnelli (1973) - The President of the Italian Republic
 Vogue la galère (1973) - Le capitaine
 L'important c'est d'aimer (1975) - Mazelli
 Rosebud (1975) - Fargeau
 La Course à l'échalote (1975) - De Rovère
 The Tenant (1976) - Husband at the accident
 Mado (1976) - Vaudable
 The Anchorite (1976) - Boswell
 Le Point de mire (1977) - Maître Leroy
 Madame Rosa (1977) - Docteur Katz
 Le Pion (1978) - Albert Carraud
 Les Misérables (1978, TV Movie) - Bishop Myriel

References

External links

1903 births
1978 deaths
20th-century French male actors
Donaldson Award winners
People from Corbeil-Essonnes
People from Ocean Township, Monmouth County, New Jersey
French male film actors
French Resistance members
Burials at Père Lachaise Cemetery